Romain Rodrigues Correia (born 6 September 1999) is a Portuguese professional footballer who plays as a defender for FC Porto B.

Club career
On 12 August 2018, Correia made his professional debut with Vitória Guimarães B in a 2018–19 LigaPro match against 
Cova da Piedade.

On 21 January 2021, Correia joined on loan to Hércules CF.

International career
Born and raised in France, Correia is of Portuguese descent. He is a youth international for Portugal, having represented the Portugal U18, 19s, and U20s.

Honours
Portugal
UEFA European Under-19 Championship: 2018

Individual
UEFA European Under-19 Championship Team of the Tournament: 2018

References

External links

1999 births
Living people
People from Castres
Portuguese footballers
Portugal youth international footballers
French footballers
French people of Portuguese descent
Association football defenders
Liga Portugal 2 players
US Albi players
Vitória S.C. B players
Segunda División B players
Hércules CF players
FC Porto B players
Portuguese expatriate footballers
Expatriate footballers in Spain
Portuguese expatriate sportspeople in Spain
Footballers from Occitania (administrative region)